Krister Hagen (born 12 January 1989) is a Norwegian former professional cyclist, who rode professionally between 2012 and 2019 for the ,  and  teams.

Major results

2015
 3rd Gooikse Pijl
 5th Time trial, National Road Championships
2016
 2nd Overall Volta ao Alentejo
 2nd Ringerike GP
 3rd Himmerland Rundt
 3rd Overall Tour de Gironde
 5th Overall East Bohemia Tour
 6th Memorial Philippe Van Coningsloo
 7th Volta Limburg Classic
 7th GP Viborg
2017
 1st  Mountains classification Kreiz Breizh Elites
 2nd Overall East Bohemia Tour
1st Stage 1
 4th Overall Volta ao Alentejo
 7th GP Viborg
2018
 1st  Overall Istrian Spring Trophy
 1st Trofej Umag
 6th Poreč Trophy
 7th Sundvolden GP

References

External links

1989 births
Living people
Norwegian male cyclists
Sportspeople from Kristiansand